The 1999 Latakia protests (or 1999 Latakia incident) were violent protests and armed clashes, which erupted in Latakia, Syria following 1998 People's Assembly's Elections. The violent events were an explosion of a long-running feud between Hafez al-Assad and his younger brother Rifaat. Two people were killed in fire exchanges of Syrian police and Rifaat's supporters during police crack-down on Rifaat's port compound in Latakia. According to opposition sources, denied by the government, the protests left hundreds of dead or injured.

Background

Attempted 1984 coup d'etat

When Hafez al-Assad suffered from heart problems in 1983, he established a six-member committee to run the country. Rifaat was not included, whereas the council consisted entirely of Sunni Muslim loyalists close to Hafez. This caused unease in the Alawi-dominated officer corps, and several high-ranking officers began rallying around Rifaat, while others remained loyal to Hafez's instructions. Rifaat's troops, then numbering more than 55,000 with tanks, artillery, aircraft and helicopters, began asserting control over Damascus, with a clear attempt to succeed his brother. Tensions between forces loyal to Hafez and those loyal to Rifaat were extreme, but by early 1984, Hafez had recovered and assumed full control, at which point most officers rallied around him. In what at first seemed a compromise, Rifaat was made vice-president with responsibility for security affairs, but this proved a wholly nominal post. Rifaat was then sent abroad on "an open-ended working visit." Both his closest supporters and others who had failed to prove their loyalty to Hafez were purged from the army and Ba'ath Party in the years that followed. Rifaat was, thereafter, confined to exile in France and Spain. He nominally retained the post of vice president until 1998, when he was stripped even of the title. He had retained a large business empire both in Syria and abroad, partly through his son Sumer.

1998 People's Assembly elections

Elections to the People's Assembly in Syria were held on 30 November and 1 December 1998, at which the NPF, led by the ruling Ba'ath party, won the majority of seats. On 11 February 1999, a national referendum verified the Assembly's decision to nominate President Assad for a fifth term in office. It was also speculated that Bashar al-Assad to be promoted to vice-presidency, after already acquiring colonel army rank in January that year. In June, Syrian authorities undertook a campaign by Bashar to counter corruption in public office, which resulted in several officials and businessmen detained. In October, after a nine-month trial, former Syrian intelligence service director got a lengthy prison sentence for alleged corruption and embezzlement of public funds.

Protests
In September, large scale arrests by security forces of some 1,000 people in Damascus and Latakia aimed on supporters and relatives of Rifaat al-Assad. 
In October, subsequent closures of Rifaat's interests provoked several days of violent clushes between Rifaat's supporters and security forces. The official version was that Rifaat had ignored a series of decrees from the Syrian Transport Ministry, ordering a demolition of his 'jetty' and an accompanying complex that had been established on 11,410 sq. meters of public land.

When the police were sent to enforce the closure of the compound, they encountered small-arms fire and retreated. The security forces then attacked and occupied the port, resulting in two people killed. Opposition reports of those events, rejected by the Syrian Government, indicated that hundreds of people were killed of injured.

After the events, the Information Minister, Muhammad Salman, warned that if Rifaat returns to Syria he would face criminal charges. It was never explained why the 'illegal' port of Rifaat had been tolerated for four years (1995–1999), before the crack-down. The 1999 crackdown in Lattakia destroyed much of Rifaat's remaining business network in Syria; large numbers of Rifaat's supporters were arrested. This was seen as tied to the issue of succession, with Rifaat having begun to position himself to succeed the ailing Hafez, who in his turn sought to eliminate all potential competition for his designated successor, his son Bashar al-Assad.

Rifaat's reaction to Bashar's presidency succession
In France, Rifaat loudly protested the succession of Bashar al-Assad to the post of president, claiming that he himself embodies the "only constitutional legality" (as vice president, alleging his dismissal was unconstitutional). He made threatening remarks about planning to return to Syria at a time of his choosing to assume "his responsibilities and fulfill the will of the people." He also exclaimed that he will rule benevolently and democratically, which he will do so with "the power of the people and the army" behind him.

See also
 Human rights in Syria
 1982 Hama massacre
 Syrian Civil War
 List of modern conflicts in the Middle East

References

1999 in Syria
1999 riots
1999 protests
Riots and civil disorder in Syria
October 1999 events in Asia